DJ Dado (born Flavio Daddato, 6 January 1967) is an Italian disc jockey and record producer who is mostly known for his remix of Mark Snow's theme for X-Files, and for covering Giorgio Moroder's "The Legend Of Babel". He produced dream trance and italo dance music between 1994 and 2004, and has done many remixes for other artists such as Boy George, Jean-Michel Jarre, and Italian singer Alexia.

Discography

Albums
 1995: The Films Collection
 1996: The Album
 1998: Greatest Hits & Future Bits
 1999: Greatest Themes '99

Singles

Remixes 
 Imperio - Atlantis (DJ Dado mix)
 Vasco Rossi - Rewind (D.J. Dado Fm First Cut) " Remix – DJ Dado, Roberto Gallo Salsotto  1999"

References

External links
 DJ Dado on Discogs

Italian DJs
Italian record producers
Living people
1967 births
Electronic dance music DJs